The 2013 season was the ninth staging of the Nicky Rackard Cup. Donegal were the 2013 Champions, defeating Roscommon in the final. However, they were not promoted to the 2014 Christy Ring Cup due to a restructuring of the competition.

Structure
6 teams compete. 4 play in Round 1, 2 go straight to Round 2.
The Round 1 winners advance to Round 2. The Round 1 losers go into quarter-finals.
The Round 2 winners advance to semi-finals. The Round 2 losers go into quarter-finals.
The quarter-final winners advance to semi-finals.

Fixtures

Round 1

Round 2

Quarter-finals

Semi-finals

Final

References

External links
 Nicky Cup fixtures

Nicky Rackard Cup
Nicky Rackard Cup